Ulrich "Ueli" Wenger (born 28 May 1944) is a Swiss cross-country skier. He competed in the men's 50 kilometre event at the 1972 Winter Olympics.

References

External links
 

1944 births
Living people
Swiss male cross-country skiers
Olympic cross-country skiers of Switzerland
Cross-country skiers at the 1972 Winter Olympics
Competitors at the 1966 Winter Universiade
Competitors at the 1968 Winter Universiade
Competitors at the 1972 Winter Universiade
Cross-country skiing coaches
Swiss sports coaches
National team coaches
Place of birth missing (living people)
20th-century Swiss people